Andrew Stuart (August 3, 1823 – April 30, 1872) was a U.S. Representative from Ohio.

Born near Pittsburgh, Pennsylvania, Stuart moved to Pittsburgh with his mother in 1834.  He received limited schooling.  He worked in a newspaper office.  He moved to Steubenville, Ohio, in 1850, where he was editor of the American Union 1850-1857.

Stuart was elected as a Democrat to the Thirty-third Congress (March 4, 1853 – March 3, 1855).  He was an unsuccessful candidate for reelection.  He engaged in the shipping business on the Gulf of Mexico and in the transportation of mails and supplies from Leavenworth, Kansas, to Santa Fe, New Mexico.  He resided in Washington, D.C., from 1869 until his death, April 30, 1872.  He was interred in Union Cemetery, Steubenville, Ohio.

Sources

External links

 

1823 births
1872 deaths
Politicians from Steubenville, Ohio
19th-century American newspaper editors
American businesspeople in shipping
Editors of Ohio newspapers
Burials at Union Cemetery-Beatty Park
Democratic Party members of the United States House of Representatives from Ohio
American male journalists
19th-century American male writers
19th-century American politicians
Journalists from Ohio
19th-century American businesspeople